Faton Toski (born 17 February 1987) is a former professional footballer who played as a midfielder. Born in SFR Yugoslavia and raised in Germany, he played for the Germany U19 national team and the Kosovo senior national team.

Club career

Early career
Toski was born in Gjilan and his family moved to Germany when he was still young. He began his career for TuS Makkabi Frankfurt and signed after one year a youth contract for Eintracht Frankfurt.

Eintracht Frankfurt
He debuted in the Bundesliga for the Eagles in a match against Werder Bremen on 12 May 2007. He scored his first goal for the club on 8 December 2007 in a 2–2 draw against Schalke 04.

Bochum
On 11 June 2010, he left Frankfurt after sixteen years and signed for VfL Bochum.

FSV Frankfurt
On 21 January 2014, Toski joined FSV Frankfurt by signing until the end of 2013–14 season, with option of renewing. He made his debut for Frankfurt on 7 February 2014 against exactly his previous team VfL Bochum, coming on as a substitute in place of Nikita Rukavytsya in the 72nd minute of the match, which Frankfurt won 2–1. During the second part of the season, Toski was used briefly, making only six appearances, only two of them as a starter.

Laçi
On 16 August 2016, Toski joined Albanian Superliga side Laçi as a free agent, signing a two-year contract. Due to his big experience, Toski was prompted team captain by coach Marcello Troisi. He made his first Laçi appearance on 7 September in the opening Albanian Superliga week against newly promoted side Korabi Peshkopi which ended in a goalless draw. On 17 October, Toski scored Laçi's first league goal of the season in the matchday 7 against Vllaznia Shkodër, after he noticed the wrong placement of goalkeeper Jasmin Agović, and taking a shot from the midfield. Until the end of the first part of the season, Toski appeared in 11 matches, including one in cup, as Laçi struggled for results. On 14 January of the following year, he left the club to purchase a career in Malaysia.

International career
Toski is former member of the Germany U19 national team and earned five caps, who scored one goal. He declared in 2010 to the Albanian media that he would play for Kosovo, but if international recognition of Kosovo's national team would be problematic, he would accept playing for Albania. He played his first international friendly match for Kosovo on 5 March 2014, appearing as a substitute in a goalless draw against Haiti.

Career statistics

Club

International

References

External links

 

1987 births
Living people
People from Gjilan
German people of Kosovan descent
Naturalized citizens of Germany
Kosovan emigrants to Germany
Association football midfielders
Kosovan footballers
Kosovo international footballers
German footballers
Germany youth international footballers
Eintracht Frankfurt players
Eintracht Frankfurt II players
VfL Bochum players
VfL Bochum II players
FSV Frankfurt players
KF Laçi players
Perak F.C. players
Bundesliga players
2. Bundesliga players
Kategoria Superiore players
Kosovan expatriate footballers
Expatriate footballers in Albania
Kosovan expatriate sportspeople in Albania
Expatriate footballers in Malaysia
Kosovan expatriate sportspeople in Malaysia